Bachelor Party is a 2012 Indian Malayalam-language black comedy gangster film directed by Amal Neerad. The film stars an ensemble cast including Prithviraj Sukumaran, Indrajith Sukumaran, Kalabhavan Mani, Asif Ali, Rahman, Vinayakan, Nithya Menen, Remya Nambeesan, John Vijay, Ashish Vidyarthi and Jinu Joseph in lead roles. The film's screenplay is by noted authors Unni R. and Santhosh Echikkanam while the original music and background score are composed by Rahul Raj.

The film released on 15 June 2012, to mixed reviews. Its plot is adapted from Johnnie To's Exiled, a 2006 Hong Kong action film. Though released to mixed reviews, the film was profitable according to Neerad.

Plot
Former mobster Tony leads a quiet life with his wife Neethu and newborn child in an old mansion, having turned over a new leaf. Unfortunately, vengeful underworld don Prakash Kamath  - whom Tony and friends once tried to assassinate - has dispatched a pair of his henchmen to cut that peaceful existence short. Once arrived, Tony's childhood friends and gangsters Ayyappan, Fakeer, Benny and Geevarghese - determined to protect Tony. After a brief showdown, the whole group comes to an uneasy truce, lays their weapons down, and bonds over dinner - after all, these men grew up together.

Reunited and searching for a way to save Tony, they visit a fixer called Chettiyar and his partner Vijanasurabhi, a prostitute. Chettiyar gives the gang two options – the job of killing a don who is Kamath's rival or looting a large quantity of foreign currency being transported. The gang chooses the first option, and Tony makes them promise that if anything happens to him, his wife and son will be looked after.

As fixed, the gang meets up at a cinema where the target don is about to strike a deal. However, Kamath crashes in as the second party of the agreement, as Chettiyar had double-crossed the friends. Kamath, recognizing Ayyappan and others, openly chastises and humiliates Tony, culminating in Tony shooting Kamath. A gunfight erupts in the theater, with Kamath and Tony being shot. The rival don, cornered by Kamath's men, comes to an agreement to share territory and profits, further agreeing to kill the gang of friends. Having narrowly escaped the theater shootout, the friends decide to take a severely shot Tony to an underground clinic for medical assistance. After negotiating a price, the doctor operates, removing the bullets from Tony. However, as he is sewing up Tony's wound, there is a loud banging at the door. Having heard this, the remainder of the waiting friends hide.

The door is answered, and Kamath and his men burst in, seeking help for injuries sustained in the theater shootout. The gang of friends manages to hide the still unconscious Tony, but he wakes up and slowly gets to his feet in a trance before collapsing. The rest of the friends try to get away, but Kamath holds Tony hostage and eventually shoots him. The gang desperately tries to retrieve their critically injured friend and escape. Tony, knowing that he is near death, asks to be taken back to his wife and daughter.

Neethu, broken over her husband's death, demands to know what has happened, and in her grief, she threatens to open fire on others. Neethu buries Tony and leaves the villa with her daughter. The reduced gang, hell-bent on taking revenge on Chettiyar and securing a livelihood for Neethu, leave in search of the currency consignment. They then come across the heavily guarded convoy carrying the notes. However, they also come across another gang attacking it. They witness all the security guards being killed, bar one crack-shot, John Karim, the chief guard protect everyone. The friends decide to help the chief guard by dispatching the rest of the gang. The friends, appreciating John's fighting skills, decide to split the currency with him and drive off to a hidden dock to transport the notes to a safe haven and a new life. Meanwhile, Neethu ends up in the hands of Chettiyar and Kamath, who in turn contact the gang of friends for the money.

Ayyappan is told to meet Kamath at Chettiyar's den; otherwise, Neethu and her child will be killed. Determined to protect Neethu after Tony's death, the friends agree and leave the John at the dock with Neethu's share of the money, telling him that they or she will return by dawn. Once at the meeting place, Kamath agrees to leave Neethu but tells them that Ayyappan must stay to face the consequences of not following orders. Ayyappan agrees to this deal, and the remainder of the friends leave with Neethu. However, as they leave, Geevarghese informs Neethu of the boat, and John and tells her to drive there. With Neethu safe, the greatly outnumbered friends open fire. In the resulting gunfight, all are killed. As the friends lie dying, they all smile, knowing that they have kept their promise to Tony. At that time, Vijanasurabhi take all the money of Chettiyaar and flee from there.

As the credits roll, all dead gangsters meet up in Hell and they party together.

Cast

 Prithviraj Sukumaran as John Karim, A Security officer who is hired to protect Tony, Geevarghese, Ayyappan and Fakir
 Indrajith Sukumaran as Geevarghese, Tony's childhood friend
 Kalabhavan Mani as Ayyappan, Tony's childhood friend
 Vishnu Unnikrishnan as Young Ayyappan
 Asif Ali as Tony, a former mobster
 Rahman as Benny, Tony's childhood friend
 Vinayakan as Fakeer, Tony's childhood friend
 Nithya Menen as Neethu, Tony's wife
 Remya Nambeesan as Vijanasurabhi, a prostitute and Chettiyar's partner
 John Vijay as Prakash Kamath, a vengeful underworld don
 Ashish Vidyarthi as Chettiyar, a fixer who double-crosses the gang
 Jinu Joseph as Jerry Kalappurakal
 Kochu Preman as Dr. Moorthy
 Thesni Khan as nurse 
 Lena as Sheela Mathews Kattuparambil (cameo appearance)
 Padmapriya Janakiraman as a dancer in the hell in an item number song "Kappa Kappa" (cameo appearance)

Production
Amal Neerad says the film was inspired particularly from Sin City, a graphic novel that was turned into a film of the same name.
"The flick might have few boys-will-be-boys, raunchy scenes, but that doesn't mean it only targets the male audience. It has all elements of an entertainer and, like its title suggests, it is about a bunch of bachelors having a blast," says the director.

Genre
Bachelor Party combines elements from several different film genres, most notably spy, action, thriller, comedy, and musical. Amal Neerad has said that the film "could be called an action-comedy, but it is tough to include it in a particular genre." He also added that "it is a travelogue that involves the journey of some friends, but I won't call it a road movie either."

Soundtrack

The music was composed, arranged and programmed by Rahul Raj while the lyrics were penned by Rafeeq Ahammed. The soundtrack was released on 20 May 2012 at a grand function at Kochi. Much before the release of the film; the soundtrack became a sensational super-hit across the state and was met with high critical acclaim.

Rahul Raj described the film's songs as "Britney Spears meets Kathakali!". The singers for Bachelor Party include actress Remya Nambeesan and singer Shreya Ghoshal working besides "fresh voices for fresh tunes" including C. J. Kuttappan, master of the Thayillam folk song group and singer Sunil Mathai, whom the composer calls the "Kailash Kher of Mollywood".

References

External links
 

2012 films
Films scored by Rahul Raj
Indian road movies
2010s Malayalam-language films
Indian gangster films
Indian comedy thriller films
Indian black comedy films
Films shot in Kochi
2010s road movies
Indian remakes of Hong Kong films
Films directed by Amal Neerad